HMS Hercules was a 74-gun third-rate ship of the line of the Royal Navy. She was launched on 5 September 1815 at Chatham.

In 1836 she formed part of an experimental squadron, which were groups of ships sent out in the 1830s and 1840s to test new techniques of ship design, armament, building and propulsion.

On 26 December 1852 Hercules departed on her way to Hong Kong to take up duties as a hospital ship. The gold rushes had put a premium on passenger ships to Australia, so she took 756 Scots civilian passengers to South Australia and Victoria for the Highland and Island Emigration Society. Many of these were emigrating under duress from the trustees of the Boreraig, Suishnish and North Uist estates of Lord Macdonald. The voyage proved disastrous, beginning almost immediately with a horrific storm, during which the ship sought refuge at Rothesay. Soon after their second departure in early January 1853, outbreaks of smallpox and typhus were discovered, necessitating a three-month quarantine at Queenstown, County Cork. 56 people died, 17 orphaned children were returned home and many others were assigned to a dozen other ships, families being broken up in the process. The ship finally arrived in Adelaide in July 1853.

Later in 1853 Hercules was placed on harbour service. In 1854 she proceeded to Hong Kong to serve as a depot and receiving ship, and she was sold there on 22 August 1865 to be broken.

Notes

References

 
 Lavery, Brian (2003) The Ship of the Line - Volume 1: The development of the battlefleet 1650–1850. Conway Maritime Press. .
 Winfield, Rif (2008) British Warships in the Age of Sail 1793–1817: Design, Construction, Careers and Fates. Seaforth Publishing. .

External links
 

 

Ships of the line of the Royal Navy
Vengeur-class ships of the line
Ships built in Chatham
1815 ships